Jean Royer de Prade (born 1624) was a French man of letters, known particularly as a historian, and for his Discours du tabac. He also wrote dramas. He was a good friend of Cyrano de Bergerac.

Works
Annibal (1649), drama
La victime d'estat ou La mort de Plautius Silvanus préteur romain (1649), tragedy
Arsace, Roy de Parthes (1666), tragedy
Discours du tabac, ou il est traité particulièrement du tabac en poudre (1671), under the pseudonym Edme Baillard
Histoire d'Allemagne (1677)

Notes

1624 births
17th-century French historians
French dramatists and playwrights
Year of death unknown